The following are tertiary education institutions, or programs within parent institutions, that are specifically intended for non-traditional students in North America.

Canada
Athabasca University
Thompson Rivers University
Woodsworth College, University of Toronto
York University
Southern Alberta Institute of Technology

United States
Agnes Scott College
Bard College
Beloit College
Boricua College
Brown University
Bryn Mawr College
Charter Oak State College
Columbia College (Missouri)
Columbia University School of General Studies
Connecticut College
Empire State College, State University of New York
Excelsior College, University of the State of New York
Fordham University
Grinnell College
Hampshire College
Harvard University Extension School
Jacksonville University
Loyola University Chicago
Mount Holyoke College
The New School for Public Engagement
New York University
Northeastern Illinois University
Northeastern University
Northwestern University
Pitzer College
Reed College
Simmons College (Massachusetts)
Smith College
Thomas Edison State College
Texas State University
Trinity College (Connecticut)
Tufts University
Union Institute & University
University of Oklahoma
University of Pennsylvania
University of Washington
Vassar College
Washington University
Wayfinding Academy
Wellesley College
Western Governors University
Williams College
Wilmington University
Yale College: Eli Whitney Students Program

See also

 Continuing education

References

Lists of schools
University and college admissions